= Rory Shayne =

Canadian criminal (born 1951)

Rory Shayne (born Berkhard Bateman; 23 March 1951) is a bank robber who gained notoriety for brazen heists committed in British Columbia and Quebec in the 1970s and 1980s.

Shayne was born in Hamburg, Germany, to a Canadian father and German mother. Shayne's parents left him and his two sister's when he was two years old until they could be brought over to Canada, after which he was placed in a Hamburg orphanage and then a foster home. Shayne had scar tissue on his chest that he claimed was from his foster mother having cut his face when he was four years old, then burning his chest with boiling water to make the injuries appear as an accident.

In Victoria, British Columbia, on 24 September 1970, Shayne led police on a daring chase which included a gunfight, hostage taking, and the commandeering of a sailing vessel. Taxi driver Dunc Addison picked up Shayne as a passenger in downtown Victoria and unknowingly drove him to the crime scene, a Canadian Imperial Bank of Commerce. Shayne returned to the cab after robbing the bank and claimed he had to get to the airport by 1 pm. Addison did not realize what had happened until Shayne fired shots through the rear window at pursuing police officers.

Shayne escaped prison on 14 December 1978. On 23 February 1979, he forced a helicopter pilot at gunpoint to help him rob a bank, before being captured ten days later. He was sentenced to twelve years for kidnapping, conspiracy and armed robbery.

In December 1981, whilst awaiting trial for an hostage-taking incident in prison, he pulled a gun on two guards in an escape attempt. He took aim at the judge and tried to shoot twice, but the gun misfired. He was sentenced to life for the attempted murder. The following month, he was sentenced to eight more years for the hostage-taking incident.

Shayne was deported to West Germany after completing his sentences.
